Eilistraee, also referred to as "The Dark Maiden", is a fictional deity in the Forgotten Realms campaign setting of the Dungeons & Dragons fantasy role-playing game. In the game world, she is a goddess in the drow pantheon, and her portfolios are song, dance, swordwork, hunting, moonlight and beauty.

Eilistraee's name is pronounced as EEL-iss-TRAY-yee", "eel-ISS-tray-ee", "eel-iss-tray-yee" or "eil-iss-tray-yee".

In the Forgotten Realms campaign setting, Eilistraee is the daughter of Corellon Larethian and of Araushnee (who later took the name Lolth after being punished by Corellon), a free-spirited and kind-hearted goddess, with a fiery streak in her personality. When, during her youth, a host of evil deities assaulted Arvandor (her home), Araushnee's treachery almost made her slay her own father. Even though she was cleared from any guilt, Eilistraee chose to share her mother's exile, because she knew that the drow would need her light and help in the dark times to come. Since after the descent of the drow, in the present era of the setting, Eilistraee tries her best to be a mother goddess to her people and bring them the hope of a new life: she fights to lead them back to the lands of light, helping them to flourish and prosper in harmony with all other races, free from Lolth's tyranny. Hers is an uphill battle, however, as her power is little and she is opposed by all the gods of the Dark Seldarine. But, despite having to overcome many hardships and setbacks, Eilistraee has never given up fighting for her people.

In the 1370s DR, her conflict with her mother over the souls of the drow race ultimately led to Eilistraee's defeat and disappearance. It lasted for about a century, until The Sundering (c. 1480s DR), when Eilistraee returned to life and to her followers.

Publication history

Advanced Dungeons & Dragons 2nd edition (1989–1999)
Eilistraee was first detailed in Ed Greenwood's The Drow of the Underdark (1991). Before being detailed in published material, Eilistraee already existed in Ed Greenwood's original Forgotten Realms. When asked to create more drow deities, the author used this opportunity to make the Dark Dancer official.

Her role in the cosmology of the Planescape campaign setting was described in On Hallowed Ground (1996).

Eilistraee received a very detailed description in Demihuman Deities (1998).

Eilistraee is described as one of the good deities that celestials can serve in the supplement Warriors of Heaven (1999).

Dungeons & Dragons 3.0 edition (2000–2007)
Eilistraee appears in 3rd edition in the Forgotten Realms Campaign Setting book (2001), and was further described in Faiths and Pantheons (2002).

Dungeons & Dragons 5th edition (2014)
Eilistraee is one of the Forgotten Realms deities that made a reappearance during the event known as The Sundering. She is mentioned as such in the novels Spellstorm and Death Masks by Ed Greenwood. In the D&D sourcebook Sword Coast Adventurer's Guide, Eilistraee receives a brief description, and is listed as one of the deities active in the post-Sundering era of the Forgotten Realms. The Mordenkainen's Tome of Foes includes a full entry for Eilistraee.

Description
In the Forgotten Realms campaign setting, Eilistraee is the patroness and protectress of those rare dark elves who yearn for a return to life on the surface Realms, at peace with other races, and to abandon the endless conflicts and intrigues that dominate the lives of most drow in the Lolth-dominated underground society. However she is also open to individuals of all races that wish for all people to live in harmony and peace (and some of them can be counted among her worshippers: humans, gnomes, elves, shapeshifters (children of the moon), half-orcs and  half-elves). Artists, like bards, musicians and dancers, and hunters can also pray to the Dark Maiden.

The Dark Maiden's home plane is the Demonweb Pits, along with the rest of the drow pantheon, which was originally located in the 66th layer of the Abyss; however, following the events of The War of the Spider Queen, the Demonweb Pits are no longer part of the Abyss, but a separate plane in its own right. She, however, has a home at Arvandor where she does not have to contend with her mother.

Eilistraee's symbol is a bastard sword standing vertically, point up, outlined against a full moon and surrounded by a nimbus of filaments representing the goddess' ankle-long hair, all in silver. An alternative version is a nude drow female, depicted with long hair, wielding a bastard sword and dancing before a full moon (this version is a stylized representation of the Dark Dancer herself).

Appearance
Eilistraee appears as a drow female of extraordinary beauty. She is 9 feet (2.7 meters) tall, with long, strong, graceful limbs and a glossy, obsidian-dark skin. Her face is like that of her mother, Lolth, with delicately sculpted features and shape, save for her large eyes and ankle-length hair, which are of a glowing silvery hue. She usually appears unclad, cloaked only by her hair and silvery radiances that are ever-moving about her body. Her appearance inspires utter awe and astonishment (as expected from a goddess), as well as deeper emotions: those who contemplate her feel as if they have found the answer to all that their soul longs for, but upon her leaving, they experience a feeling of deep loss, or even desolation, though only for a brief time (as Sharlario Moonflower and his son felt when the Dark Dancer manifested to them, warning them of the dangers of Ilythiir).

Personality

Due to a history of grief and losses, and to the suffering of her people, melancholy and sadness are deeply rooted in Eilistraee's heart. It's a hard battle to endure; one that can weigh her down, but that has also taught her to search for and nurture beauty everywhere, even in places like the Underdark, where it doesn't seem to belong. Eilistraee fights her melancholy by striving to bring hope and joy where there is sorrow, so that no moment is lost to gloom, and to make life flourish wherever she goes. She's learned to find happiness in peace and arts, especially music and dance; in simple things like seeing artists composing and performing, craftsmen at their work, people doing acts of kindness, and lovers in tender moments. She especially takes delight in helping the needy in various practical ways, and in blessing artists with sudden bursts of creativity and inspiration.

As a young goddess, Eilistraee was a free spirit, with a moody and wild side and an unpredictable temper. Even as she matured, these traits never really left her: she has a fiery streak and is prone to wild action, especially in protection of her faithful when they're harmed. The evil that is inflicted upon—and perpetuated by—most drow causes a burning anger within her, one that can cause her to lash out. She's comforted that some worked their way free of the Spider Queen's web.

The Dark Maiden is particularly close to her people. Aside from providing practical help in their everyday life, she's known to offer comfort and support in various ways (see Activities), and in the daily ritual known as the Evensong, she "listens" to the wordless messages of her followers as they let out the emotions, experiences, and reflections gathered during the day. When the right time comes, she also personally accompanies her followers who don't die in battle to their afterlife in a moving celebration known as the Last Dance. Eilistraee doesn't test her followers, as the challenges of life are enough of a test themselves. She values the intent behind their actions more than the actual success.

Though focused on the drow, Eilistraee accepts folk of all races who dance along her path, who delight in life and in the free-form expression of life in all its forms. She fights so that all races could live peacefully together, helping and accepting each other despite their differences, and strongly believes in the possibility of redemption for those who have fallen to evil, especially the drow.

Activities

Ed Greenwood, the creator of Eilistraee and the Forgotten Realms, meant her to take the role of a nurturing and protecting mother-goddess for the whole drow race. In-world, when the Dark Elves were condemned and cursed by her father, despite her innocence, she chose to share the exile and curse of her people, her mother and her brother. She made such a choice so that she could be with the drow when they would have needed her the most, to provide a light in the darkness and a beacon of hope to her children in the difficult times that – as she had foreseen – would come upon them. So, in the present times of the Forgotten Realms, Eilistraee teaches and shows to the drow kindness and love, the joy and freedom of life that were taken away from them, calling them to her and singing to their hearts. The goddess helps the dark elves to strengthen, grow, and flourish in a hostile surface world, protecting her faithful and aiding them in hunting, swordcraft, and other practical matters of their everyday lives.

Eilistraee prefers not to act openly and only rarely directly intervenes in her people's lives. But she is known to watch over them and help and assist any creature that she favors (even if not her worshiper) in immediately useful ways. For example, the sound of her hunting horn can be heard when her faithful are in danger (or when people needing help are nearby) heartening them and scaring away dangerous creatures. Her silvery radiance or silvery moths guide drow who are lost in the darkness to a safe place, or lighten childbirths that occur in the dark. Hers is the force that brings a stag within the reach of hungry drow. Eilistraee also manifests, usually through her light, in the moments when her "children" need her visible blessing and support or comfort. Overall, Eilistraee believes that individual drow have to find their own paths to redemption, and that her forcefully interfering would prevent this. Nevertheless, she is not unwilling to retaliate when her followers are threatened.

Eilistraee sings her call to all dark elves—from the highest matron mother to the lowest male slave—sending them dreams or visions, showing them a different, better life (especially when they are close to the surface). Lolth is powerless to stop these visions, as too much interference from two goddesses could easily bring a mortal's mind to insanity. The drow definitely come to know about and "feel" the Dark Dancer at some point in their lives, but many of them either don't understand said dreams or emotions or choose to ignore, disbelieve, or reject them. Even then, while not many refuse Lolth to cleave to Eilistraee, many secretly yearn for the goddess and all that she wishes for them. In fact, it is not unusual for them to choose to spare a stricken worshiper of Eilistraee if they think that no priestess of Lolth is watching, or to fail to pass on to other drow something they might have seen of their activities, or to stop to watch a dance of Eilistraee worshipers rather than disrupting it.

However, despite all her efforts, Eilistraee is opposed by the power of Lolth and the other evil drow gods, and what she can do is limited.

Manifestations
Eilistraee's most common sign is a silvery radiance (sometimes accompanied by a snatch of song or a few echoing notes of a harp). Eilistraee uses this light to assist her people: she is known to use it as a beacon guiding those lost in the woods, to shine a light on something dropped in the dark, and to illuminate or bless dark places where women give birth. She also uses it to bless a worshiper in various ways. Swords enveloped by the silvery light can not be broken or damaged and struck with maximum force. Blessed living creatures always react first in battle, can better evade or withstand blows, can strike more accurately, and can wound even creatures that needed only magic to be harmed.

Sometimes, Eilistraee can use her radiance to bless the faithful or even non-faithful who decide to honor her with a solitary dance, turning the creature's hair into a mane of silvery, dancing flames. This can last as long as a month, or even be permanent. She also manifests when one of her priests leads a new convert to her faith in prayer, which is itself an offering to Eilistraee. She does this often, about 68% of the time.

On rare occasions, she can decide to grant a male follower or a follower with no priestly powers who nevertheless follow her cause with the temporary ability to manifest her moonfire. It is Dark Maiden's most iconic spell, a beacon of light, whose intensity and color can be controlled by the creator at will (ranging from a faint glow to a clear, bright – but not blinding – light). Moonfire has the same intensity as moonlight, and it is generally used as a light source for reading, to see in the dark, as a signal for communication or for artistic purposes. Manifested moonfire can move as the creator wished and around the creator's body as fast as desired, however, it moves up to 6.6 feet per second when far from the caster's body. The blessed recipient can guide it in any direction, through any opening, and cause the glow to appear in any size. Eilistraee gifts her moonfire to show her blessing or support, or simply to provide some light. However, the lucky bearer has no control over the moonfires duration, intensity, or location – such things are solely up to the goddess.

Eilistraee is known to sometimes conjure the sound of a high and distant hunting horn, to rally or hearten her followers or to scare off aggressors, making them believe that reinforcements are coming for those harassed. When there are no enemies about, worshipers interpret the sound of the horn to mean there is someone close by they need to aid.

Sometimes Eilistraee appears in person, to show her favor, give a blessing, or hearten her followers. Worshipers lucky enough to see her usually only glimpse her from afar, balanced atop a distant hillock or battlement, with her silver hair flowing behind her. At times, she can also appear during celebrations dedicated to her, dancing and leaping from the flames of bonfires, or manifest herself by night, cloaked and cowled and with her radiance dimmed, to travelers in the woodlands, usually to test their kindness. However and whenever she appears, her song is heard: a tune of eerie beauty, moving many to tears.

Eilistraee demonstrates her favor and happiness through the discovery of particular minerals or gems (like mithral, moonbars, moonstones, and silver) or with a sudden inspiration to write a beautiful song or poem, or to craft a magnificent sword for those who had the ability.

However, the Dark Dancer can also let her displeasure be known, and does so by making a cold breeze rise, by making the disfavored ones feel a chill in their hands or feet, through a sudden lack of inspiration or talent in any form of art, or through the failure to catch anything while hunting.

Abilities
Eilistraee has the ability to dance and sing to elicit emotions in her allies and foes, or to inspire courage and enhance her allies' skills: such is the beauty and power of her art that even creatures normally immune to such effects can't resist.

Among her great godly skills, Eilistraee is an excellent weaponsmith, and can freely create almost any magical item pertaining to beauty, hunting, moonlight, song, or swordplay; she is an expert in matters of magic, nature, and faith. As the goddess of dance, song, and hunt she is an awe-inspiring dancer, singer and acrobat; and she is a supreme hunter. Eilistraee specializes in swords of all forms, but is an absolute mistress of the bastard sword. She fights combining the grace and agility of her dance with the lethality of her fencing skills.
The Dark Dancer can instantly become aware of threats posed to good-aligned drow, to her followers, or to drow thinking of rejecting the faith of the deities of the drow pantheon, but only if their number is equal to or greater than five hundred.

Teachings

In the Forgotten Realms, Eilistraee, like all deities, has a definite set of teachings for her followers.

 On helping others
Aid and protect all folks in need, of any race, weak and strong, kind or rude, promoting harmony and acceptance among all races. Lend your help to all those who fight for good whenever there are ways to do so. When not fighting evil, be always kind—even to those who show rudeness—and aid others in acts of kindness.

Strangers are your friends. Hungry travelers are to be fed and the homeless are to be given shelter—under your own roof if needed--. When traveling and while adventuring, feed, help and protect all those in need met along the way as a prayer and offering to the goddess. Patrol the lands about, especially in cold winters, so that all those who are lost, hurt, or bitten by the cold can be given appropriate cures and shelter.

 On promoting joy, arts, and beauty
Bring happiness and merriment everywhere you go, lifting people's hearts with kindness, gaiety, songs, jests, and revelry. Nurture and create beauty, promote and practice music and dance, learn new songs and dances and how to play, craft and repair musical instruments. Pass this learning on whenever possible and use it to bring joy to friends and strangers alike. Feasts should always be joyful events and food eaten with the accompaniment of music, save for sad occasions. Practice swordwork, learning new techniques with the blade.

 On Drow
Encourage drow to return to the surface world whenever and wherever there are ways to do so. Work to promote peace with other races, helping the drow to forge their own place in the world and become part of its rightful, nonevil inhabitants. Aid all dark elves who are in danger or in need of help. If they are in combat, the fighting must be ended as soon as possible, with as little bloodshed as possible. All drow met, when not working evil on others, are to be given the message of Eilistraee:

 On food
Learn how to best cook food and game, and gather new recipes and spices whenever there is the chance to do so. Try to feed yourself by your own gardening and hunting skills and assist hunters when possible. If food is aplenty, part of it is to be set aside and given to all those in need (especially outcasts and individuals of other races)--try to always carry some food for this purpose--. Give any remaining food to the priestesses of the Dark Maiden, as they will do the same and none shall go hungry.

 On conflict 
Repay violence with swift violence, quickly removing dangers and threats, so that the fewest may be hurt.
When fighting evil, the bodies of the fallen enemies are to be burned as an offering to the goddess, unless they happen to be edible and nonsentient and hungry people are near.
When faithful, friends and allies fall in battle, priestesses of the Dark Maiden must comfort and soothe those who are mourning the loss, and provide a funeral song and burial.

 On possessions
Wealth should be used to buy food, swords, armor and musical instruments and to assist the work of the goddess. When helping others, take as price no more than a single tool or favor that can be used to serve the goddess' will.

Eilistraee and her church detest slavery and actively fight it whenever possible. Followers of the Dark Maiden are therefore forbidden from taking slaves, and prisoners of war (mostly Lolth-worshipping drow or untrusted individuals who have acquired too much knowledge and that are held for some time to make sure that such knowledge isn't used against the followers of Eilistraee) are usually made work for food and shelter, but they aren't owned and can't be commanded by anyone (only supervisors assigned by the decision-makers among the Dark Dancer's worshippers can give them orders, in selected cases).

Relationships
Eilistraee's allies are the elven gods of the Seldarine, as well as Mystra, Selûne, Lurue, Haela Brightaxe, Callarduran Smoothhands, and the other good deities of the Underdark races. While the Dark Maiden and the Seldarine are allies, their relationship is a difficult one, because of the division between drow and elves and because of the perception that many elves have of their "dark kin". This is especially true for Shevarash, with whom Eilistraee barely manages to keep an uneasy truce. Among the elven powers, Eilistraee is only close to Erevan Ilesere. Eilistraee is surprisingly close to the human goddess of magic Mystra, through Qilue Veladorn, seventh of the Seven Sisters, who serves both goddesses as Chosen of Mystra and as Chosen of Eilistraee.

Her enemies are the drow gods of the Dark Seldarine—namely Kiaransalee, Ghaunadaur, her nephew Selvetarm and especially her own mother Lolth. She also counts as foes the other evil deities of the Underdark: Deep Duerra and Laduguer, Blibdoolpoolp, the Blood Queen, Diinkarazan and Diirinka, the Great Mother, Gzemnid, Ilsensine, Ilxendren, Laogzed, and Maanzecorian before his death. She also counts as an enemy Malar, a rival and evil god of the hunt in the surface world. However, Selvetarm wasn't always among the Dark Dancer's enemies—once, he admired his aunt and she inspired to turn toward goodness, before Lolth tricked him into a terrible fall. The Dark Maiden is infuriated by the evil and corruption of both Lolth and Ghaunadaur.

Before 1489 DR, Eilistraee counted Vhaeraun, her own brother, among her enemies, and she was saddened by his cruelty and selfishness. However, post 1489 DR, after the time spent as the Masked Lady, and after their return during the Sundering, Eilistraee and Vhaeraun deeply know and understand each other. As a consequence, they are closer, and have become more open to each other's ways and goals. They have reached a truce, even if some of their followers still remain foes.

History
In the Forgotten Realms campaign setting, Eilistraee was born the daughter of Corellon Larethian, head of the elven gods, and Araushnee the Weaver (who later took the name of Lolth), a minor elven goddess. She was the sister of Vhaeraun. In the game world, her history is a troubled and difficult one, described below.

Exile
The commonly accepted version of the story or myth of how Eilistraee came to her role in the drow pantheon runs as follows.

Around −30000 DR, ambitious and traitorous, envious of the authority that her consort Corellon had on the elven people, Araushnee (with the cooperation of her son, Vhaeraun) gathered a host of deities opposed to the Seldarine, tricking them into assaulting Arvandor in an attempt to overthrow Corellon. The Weaver tried to seduce Fenmarel Mestarine, elven god of outcasts and rebels, to join her in the imminent rebellion. While he was initially tempted by Araushnee's advances, he ultimately declined the offer and, knowing Corellon's deep love for his consort, trusted Sehanine Moonbow to find a solution. Once aware of Araushnee's plans, Sehanine tried to dissuade her from such madness, but the Weaver reacted violently, defeating and imprisoning the moon goddess with the aid of Vhaeraun.

When the attack began, Eilistraee (whose skills in archery, scouting, and hunting were widely known among the Seldarine) was the first to spot the threat, allowing her father and the other elven deities to prepare a defense. The Dark Maiden took part in the battle, enthusiastic and proud to be able to fight by her father's side in defense of their home. In the heat of the battle that ensued, when Ghaunadaur made its entrance, Corellon painfully realized that the threat had to have come from within the Seldarine itself, as a being like Ghaunadaur could only enter Arvandor if a true evil already lurked within the plane. His sorrow grew even more intense when he realized that his lover, Araushnee, was behind it, as she stood observing the battle in triumph. Seeing the distraction and shock of the elven lord, an ogre god took advantage of the situation and charged towards his position: he almost managed to end his life, but Eilistraee acted swiftly to defend her father, loosing an arrow at the charging ogre-god. The young goddess didn't know, however, that the scabbard that Araushnee had crafted for Corellon's sword was imbued with a curse which magically drew the shaft of the arrow, changing its path to instead pierce his chest. Seeing the scene from the skies, Aerdrie Faenya, unaware of the deception, struck the still-shocked Eilistraee down, incapacitating her. Despite Corellon being almost fatally wounded, the battle was ultimately won by the forces of the Seldarine and, as soon as the last invader was driven from Arvandor, the elven deities – still unbelieving that the Dark Maiden could act against her father – gathered around the unconscious elven lord, trying to aid him and save his life.

It was then that Araushnee, faking grief, put in motion the second part of her plan (as she had intended for the invaders to be defeated). Pretending to do her best to save her lover, she tried to use a concoction of poisonous herbs, prepared by Eilistraee for the arrows of the mortal dark elves, to finish Corellon, passing it for a healing elixir made up of water from Elysium and healing herbs. She hoped that if her treachery was uncovered, she could still blame Eilistraee, as the potion had been her work. This plan didn't go well: Sehanine Moonbow, whom Araushnee and Vhaeraun had ambushed and trapped before the invasion (because she had seen their true intentions and tried to warn them against their plans), had in fact managed to free herself and intervened in time to save Corellon (together with Aerdrie Faenya and Hanali Celanil, in the form of the triune goddess Angharradh) and free Eilistraee from guilt.

After the elven lord regained consciousness and the truth was made clear, he had to take the painful decision to banish all the dark elven deities for their roles in the war against the Seldarine. Eilistraee was cleared from any wrongdoing, considered only an unwitting participant, but regardless she insisted upon this punishment from her reluctant father. She foresaw that the dark elves would need a beacon of good within their reach and her help and support in the times to come.

Wandering
After her exile, the Dark Maiden wandered Toril, the same world that the elves had chosen as their home. For centuries, she fought Vhaeraun's corruption of the Ilythiiri, thwarting his efforts to gain influence over all the dark elves of the south. But this only allowed Lolth and Ghaunadaur to fill the void and command great authority over them, posing an even greater threat.

The following centuries inflicted blow after blow to Eilistraee and her followers. During the Crown Wars (−12000 DR to −9000 DR), she could only mitigate the growing control Lolth, Vhaeraun, and Ghaunadaur had over the dark elves. In −10500 DR, the Dark Disaster – a magical cataclysm unleashed by the elves of Aryvandaar – caused the death of many of her people in Miyeritar, severely weakening the goddess' power. Meanwhile, Lolth and Ghaunadaur gained great influence among the dark elves, culminating in −10000 DR, when the Seldarine and the elven court cursed and exiled all dark elves (including Eilistraee's followers, turning them into drow), because of the corruption that Lolth and the balor Wendonai were spreading among the noble houses and the influent people of Ilythiir. They feared that such corruption could spread among the population (the faith of Lolth was becoming common, among the other ones). Eilistraee tried to be a guide for the exiled drow, but in her state she could not rival Lolth as deity of the dark elves, and the Spider Queen led them in the Underdark. After this event, Lolth's and Ghaunadaur's persecution of worshipers of rival deities further marginalized the influence of the Lady of the Dance for millennia.

Eilistraee found an unlikely protégé in her nephew-god, Selvetarm. He was the son of Vhaeraun and Zandilar the Dancer (who would later become one with Bast, forming Sharess), but had spurned both his parents and walked alone for centuries, neither good nor evil. Finally, he was befriended by his aunt Eilistraee, and grew close to her. Selvetarm came to admire her goodness and appreciate her teachings, and the goddess hoped that, by teaching him her ways and redeeming him, he could become an exemplar that would aid her in healing the rift between the dark elves and the Seldarine. However, said hope and friendship ended in the late 3rd century after Dalereckoning, when Lolth tricked Selvetarm into slaying Zanassu (a demon lord whom Lolth considered her rival, as he claimed to have power over spiders), by promising him that doing so would gain him the appreciation of the Dark Maiden. But Selvetarm was overwhelmed by the demonic essence and he fell wholly to evil, ending up as Lolth's champion. Spiteful Lolth did this to prevent her daughter gaining an ally among the Dark Seldarine.

Despite all these setbacks, Eilistraee kept fighting to bring her hope to the drow and lead them back to their rightful place in the light. It was only after Dalereckoning that her faith regained a degree of prominence in Faerûn.

War of the Spider Queen and Lady Penitent
In the 1372 DR, the goddess Lolth went into a state of hibernation, a period called the Silence of Lolth, with Selvetarm protecting her, as part of a plan to increase her power and separate her divine realm, the Demonweb Pits, from the Abyss. For about one year, she stopped granting spells to her followers and became effectively inactive. During this time, Lolth's absence led a considerable number of her followers to seek alternatives in the other deities of the Dark Seldarine and this resulted in Eilistraee gaining followers and influence. She chose one of her new converts, Halisstra Melarn, to wield the artifact known as the Crescent Blade, which could be used to kill Lolth before her awakening (in 1373 DR). Halisstra went on a mission to the Demonweb Pits, leading two fellow priestesses of the Dark Maiden, Uluyara and Feliane. However, after being defeated at the hand of Quenthel Baenre, Halisstra ultimately decided to betray Eilistraee and convert back to the awakened Lolth. The Spider Queen punished her former heresy by turning her into the Lady Penitent, whose duty was to hunt drow who tried to turn to other faiths. The Crescent Blade was left broken, lying in the Demonweb Pits.

Even after Lolth emerged from her Silence, the deities of the Dark Seldarine continued battling for supremacy over the drow or, in Eilistraee's case, to free them from Lolth's renewed grasp.

After the end of the Silence of Lolth, working on the Spider Queen's side, Selvetarm ordered his Judicators to initiate a series of attacks against the shrines and temples of Eilistraee. At the same time, the church of Vhaeraun planned to cast a High Magic spell to allow Vhaeraun to enter his sister's realm and assassinate her. The followers of the Masked Lord lacked the trust to cast that kind of magic, so they worked to kill various priestesses of Eilistraee and trap their soul, in order to use them for the ritual.

Eventually, Qilué Veladorn managed to learn about their plan and worked to disrupt it, alongside the drow mage Q'arlynd Melarn. Q'arlynd had come in contact with the followers of Eilistraee through a portal to the surface that a priestess had opened in the ruins of Ched Nasad, and Qilué managed to gain his loyalty: the drow mage saw in her, chosen of both Eilistraee and Mystra, a worthy leader. Qilué asked the mage to take the place of one of the Vhaerunites and try to disrupt the ritual. Q'arlynd accepted the task to prove his loyalty to the Dark Maiden. Meanwhile, Cavatina Xarann, a Darksong Knight serving Eilistraee, was sent by Qilué on a mission to recover the Crescent Blade from the Demonweb pits. 
While Cavatina was in the Demonweb Pits and Q'arlynd was attempting to stop the Vhaerunites, Qilué led the defense against the followers of Selvetarm who tried to attack the Promenade of the Dark Maiden.

On Nightal 20 of the 1375 DR, Cavatina killed the demigod Selvetarm (with the help of the Lady Penitent), using the  Crescent Blade that she had recovered almost intact. On the same date, Q'arlynd failed to accomplish his mission and Vhaeraun managed to enter his sister Eilistraee's realm and attempt to assassinate her. No mortal actually witnessed the battle that ensued, so what happened remained largely unknown. However, Eilistraee emerged from the battle alive, suggesting that Vhaeraun had failed and perished at the hand of his sister. Chaos and despair spread among the followers of the Masked Lord, but some thought that their god was still alive, and that the twins had a plan and agreed to merge and work together against their mother for a time. Others were convinced that Vhaeraun succeeded and masked as Eilistraee. Either way, it was certain that after the event, Eilistraee was changed: she held both her brother's and her own portfolios, she gained the title of "Masked Lady", and caused her followers and Vhaeraun's to cooperate, albeit uneasily.

On the same date, Cavatina Xarann, a priestess and Darksong Knight of Eilistraee, killed the demigod Selvetarm (with the help of the Lady Penitent) using the Crescent Blade.

In 1377 DR, Kiaransalee and her cultists initiated hostilities against the Masked Lady and her followers. Qilué Veladorn and the church of Eilistraee retaliated with an assault against the Acropolis of Thanatos, in the drow city of V'elddrinnsshar, the main temple of the Vengeful Banshee. The war ended with the defeat of the cultists of Kiaransalee and with Eilistraee's answer to the demigoddess' attack: a spell performed by the drow mage Q'arlynd Mealrn, which deleted her name from the minds of every Torillian being, including Kiaransalee herself, leading to her disappearance.

Between the 1377 DR and 1379 DR, cultists of Ghaunadaur attacked the Promenade in the attempt to destroy the prison, guarded by the followers of Eilistraee, that prevented their god from creeping to Toril. Their attempt failed, but the inhabitants of the temple suffered heavy losses.

In Flamerule of 1379 DR, the Masked Lady, while inhabiting the body of Qilué Veladorn, was killed by Halisstra Melarn using the Crescent Blade. Qilué planned to kill the balor Wendonai (whom Lolth used to corrupt the drow into following her), whose essence was held inside the Crescent Blade, by taking it into her and destroying it with Mystra's silver fire. If successful, she would have freed the drow from the demon's influence, but he managed to trick Halisstra into killing Qilué before that could happen, making her believe that the chosen and her goddess were actually Lolth.

Meanwhile, another High Magic ritual performed by the drow mage Q'arlynd Melarn transformed those drow not tainted by Wendonai and the followers of Eilistraee back into their original dark elven form, and Corellon Larethian thus permitted the souls of Eilistraee's faithful and the newly transformed dark elves to enter Arvandor.

The Sundering and Rebirth
During the 1480s DR, with the event known as the Sundering, the Overgod Ao separated the twin worlds Abeir and Toril once again and rewrote the Tablets of Fate (an artifact which contains the name of every deity of the pantheon and their portfolio). During that time, many deities of Toril who were considered dead or lost managed to return to life, the Dark Maiden being among them. Post-Sundering, after Flamerule of 1489 DR, Eilistraee is alive again and she is one of the deities with whom the returned Mystra is currently sharing the Weave (as revealed in Ed Greenwood's novel Spellstorm).

Eilistraee has taken her title of Dark Maiden once again, as she and her brother Vhaeraun are separate entities, but the two siblings have reached a reciprocal understanding and the enmity between them is no more. The Dark Maiden has personally manifested and danced with her followers (especially in the Sword Coast region), who have returned under her protection and enthusiastically spread the voice of her return.

For example, Eilistraee has appeared personally, dancing in the moonlight, near the walls of Waterdeep, witnessed by the inhabitants of the city. This has led many of her followers to the City of Splendors, with the intent of building a temple to the goddess within its walls. Some have asked for the sponsorship of the harpers, intending to buy a few buildings, in order to destroy them and then conjure a small wood and rivers, to use as a dancing place to express their faith.

Followers and clergy 

In the Forgotten Realms, the worshipers of Eilistraee mostly consist of those drow who hope to escape the danger and darkness of the Underdark and Lolth's evil, taking back their place in the surface world. However, in line with her ideals, Eilistraee welcomes beings of all races: elves, humans, and especially half-elves are among the followers of the goddess. They share the desire of seeing all races living in harmony, without pointless discrimination or wars, and work towards that goal (and those among them who are drow also fight to build their own place on the Realms above).

The faithful of Eilistraee, however, are little known and poorly understood by inhabitants of both the Realms Above and the Underdark. Her worshippers are figures of myth and superstition and targets of prejudice and wild mistruths. Some surface dwellers believe that they are the disguised vanguard of the Spider Goddess's plan to take over the surface, while those drow who follow Lolth or other evil deities suspect them of being surface elf spies and saboteurs posing as drow as a prelude to invasion. Most non-elves can not comprehend the existence a good drow deity, while surface elves are uncomfortable considering it, finding Eilistraee a threat to their doctrine that the dark elves were wholly to blame for the Crown Wars and other ancient tragedies.

The Harpers appreciate the hope that the goddess and her faith represent and assist them on the surface of Faerun.

Composition of the Clergy

The clergy of Eilistraee are collectively known as "the Dark Ladies", although individual temples often have their own naming conventions for both the clergy collectively and individual titles. Young initiates and acolytes are known as Maids. Individual titles vary greatly from temple to temple, but some suitable examples include Moon Dancer, Moon Singer, Dark Huntress, Argent Maid, Living Sword, Unsheathed Blade, Sword Smith, Bright Edge of Darkness, Darksong Knight, Protector and Ghost of the Moonstruck Night.

Clerics of Eilistraee are individuals of any race, but almost always female, because – due to the goddess' nature of nurturing mother – One cannot truly feel the Divine Dance of Eilistraee PROPERLY except as a female. However, during the 1300s, the faith of Eilistraee started to open up to male priests: this was Eilistraee's choice and by 1373 DR all her clerics were aware of it (as the goddess is close to her clergy).

At the time, some female worshippers initially disliked this change, and priests could be met with distrust by some priestesses, who feared that they could merely be hungry for power: they would be wary of males, act with coldness and watch over their actions (at least until acceptance on a personal level was achieved, by working alongside them). Nonetheless, no priestess would reject males who wished to join the clergy, or act against them, refuse to aid and accept them, or renounce Eilistraee's vision. On the contrary, taken as a whole, all clergy of the Dark Maiden welcomed the fellowship of more and more followers of the goddess, no matter what gender.

However, in order to truly feel the Divine Dance of Eilistraee (and therefore become priests), males had to Dance the Changedance at least once, spending time as females (including everyday life, and not only rituals). Generally, this wasn't perceived negatively, and with time the priests found themselves feeling the need to spend more and more time as female, because through that they could feel and cleave more fully to the nature of the Dark Maiden (and the willingness to remain shapechanged for long periods of time was seen and appreciated as a mark of dedication by the female clergy). However, these priests were few and usually secretive.

Near the 1489 DR, with the return of Eilistraee, the situation was further changed. The cooperation with the church of Vhaeraun that happened between 1375 DR and 1379 DR, the new friendship between Eilistraee and her brother and their experience as the Masked Lady, has led to a further opening towards male priests. They can in fact directly cleave to Eilistraee, without the need of "dancing the Changedance".

Organization
Communities
Most Eilistraeen/Eilistraee-dominated (as generally Torilian people tend to worship more than one deity) communities form around a temple or shrine of the goddess and for this reason, they are usually led by priestesses, but any member can express concerns and ideas about any matters, and priestesses listen to them before making their decision. Outside of the Clergy, male and female worshippers usually have the same duties and roles: guardians, warriors, experts, artisans/artists, gathering food and other general works. Males are primarily involved in the decision-making through their expertise in given fields, but they rarely are priests (and therefore leaders). Differently from Lolthite societies, males are, however, generally treated with fairness and equality (even if at times, some priestesses or even whole communities could have a different stance, likely because centuries of dogma and tradition due to Lolth's doctrine were hard to overcome)

Clergy
The clergy of Eilistraee is different from most other religious organizations in that there wasn't any hierarchy or chain of command, as everyone stood on the same ground (even if most followers recognized Qilué Veladorn of The Seven Sisters as their guide and voice of the goddess).

Activities of the clergy
The Church of Eilistraee works by putting their goddess' teachings in practice. Their main duty is to encourage the drow to return to the surface world, reaching to them whether they are fugitives, raiders or inhabitants of the Underdark. They show to the drow that a different kind of life, far from Lolth, is possible, and assist them in making this choice by giving them aid, food, acceptance and safe places to live. Eilistraeeans perform missions underground, looking for those dark elves who are in need of their help and that can be brought on the surface (mostly slaves, commoners, fallen and hunted nobles or drow who are generally unsatisfied with the life that Lolth imposes them), bringing them the Message of Eilistraee. Many of them carry tiny swords to give out to drow in the Underdark, that serve as keys for safe passage to temples, or as identification tokens.
Some priestesses of the Dark Maiden live in Lolth-dominated drow settlements, hiding from the clergy of the Spider Queen, even posing as her followers, in order to carry out the above-mentioned missions. These clerics and the Eilistraeen converts who have to hide their faith in order to let it spread and to survive under the thumb of Lolth are known as Secret Moondancers.

As the Dark Maiden's teachings require, the clerics of Eilistraee actively work to promote harmony between drow and other races, so that their people can be accepted and live in peace in their rightful place on the surface. This also involves the activities described in the section about Eilistraee's Teachings, like lending their own sword, helping hands, cures and food to assist people of any race in need, both to gain their acceptance (dispelling fears and prejudices about Eilistraee's goal) and because the priestesses of the Dark Maiden believe that it is the right thing to do.

The Church of the Dark Dancer also acts through envoys, diplomats and emissaries living near (or sometimes within) other races' settlements. An example is Karsel'lyn Lylyl-Lytherraias, former agent of Queen Amlaruil Moonflower and ambassador of the Eilistraeen Dark Elves on the elven island of Evermeet, who is trying to gain her people a place in the land that is supposed to be a safe haven for all elven people. Seyll Auzkovyn and the followers of Eilistraee active near the elven and human community of Elventree also work for a peaceful coexistence between their people and the other inhabitants of the area. The Promenade of the Dark Maiden is another example of this, founded because of Eilistraee's direct request to Qilué Veladorn. The function of the temple is to prevent the avatar of the slime god Ghaunadaur from freeing itself and attacking the city of Waterdeep, which stands on the surface upon the shrine, to counter slavery and slaver merchants and organizations of the near Skullport (while also offering shelter to former slaves), and to and help drow exiles (or fleeing from danger) to eventually find their place in the lands of light.

The faithful also have routine activities of food growing and gathering/hunting, preparation of cures and all that is needed to aid the drow to return to the surface. They also gather resources, weapons and armors (preferably magical) to use for their cause. Patrols in the areas near Eilistraeen communities are common (especially during cold winters) and have the purpose of finding any traveler (including fugitive drow or even wounded drow raiders) hurt, lost or hungry, and to spot (and possibly neutralize) potential threats for the community and other settlements in the area.

Aside from their work towards the main goal of their goddess, the priestesses of the Dark Maiden are known to nurture beauty, music and song; to assist hunters; to help people of any race through acts of kindness, and to spread joy and merriment (often through song and dance) whenever they see ways to do so (and it is appropriate). They have also to be skilled in the art of playing of at least one of the Dark Maiden's favored instruments (horn, flute, or harp); to be adequate singers as well as fit, graceful dancers, and to pass along and teach their skill. They gather songs and musical knowledge constantly and acquire training in the use of the sword when they can. Clerics are allowed to go adventuring, as long as they keep following Eilistraee's teachings, aiding, feeding and defending the needy on the way. Among their duties is also to convert at least one stranger per moon to the worship of Eilistraee.

Orders

 Sword Dancers of Eilistraee
Specialized clerics are known as Sword Dancers of Eilistraee. They are excellent dancers and have the ability to use the sword in a unique fashion: through an agile, acrobatic and almost artistic swordplay, they can fight in such a graceful way to resemble a dance. To become a Sword Dancer, a drow has to spend at least 1 month on the surface, dancing each moonlit night for Eilistraee, and has to witness dawn at least once.
The sword dancers lead the missions to find, help and protect any drow looking to return to the surface (or that can be made to return) and join a different life. They are skilled diplomats, especially active near elven and other races' settlements, working to establish peace and cooperation between the drow and the surface dwellers.

These priestesses also have various unique magical powers, granted to them by their goddess. They can form a particular bond with their sword, which allows them to infuse the weapon with Eilistraee's magic. They can imbue it with a variety of magical enhancements, let it sing like a singing sword (making them strike with increased precision and rallying their hearts), or let it dance (like a dancing weapon) to attack the enemy on its own or to protect the priestess.

The Sword Dancers have the ability to cast the magic missile spell, or to use its energy to empower their next sword strike, surrounding their blade with blue-white flames. They can also use their magic to temporarily enchant a bladed weapon with a silvery glow that increases the precision of its strikes, without the possibility of it being dispelled.

The Sword Dancers can sing and dance to channel the power of Eilistraee, and have the ability to sing their magic even amidst the chaos of the battle, while dodging and dancing around or while wounded. This magic is known as Spellsong. They can also manifest Eilistraee's moonfire at will.

 Darksong Knights
The Darksong Knights are an elite order of Eilistraeen crusaders, mostly active in the Southern Faerûn, beneath the lands of ancient Ilythiir. Composed entirely of crusaders and warrior/priests, each members of this order chose to devote her life not only to the furthering of the Dark Maiden's ethos, but also to the destruction of the Abyss-spawned yochlol, also known as the handmaidens of Lolth.

 Silverhair Knights
The Silverhair Knights are an order of Eilistraeens fully dedicated to the conversion and subsequent protection of drow who have come to the surface of Faerûn. They are most active in regions where drow attempted to establish a foothold on the surface, mostly in Cormanthor. They are different from the Sword Dancers in that they follow very closely Eilistraee's teachings: they vow to never willingly kill any drow. They aim to show to other dark elves the strength that can be found in compassion, and that living in peace, without the endless conflict and paranoia that rule their society, is a concrete possibility. They are convinced that this can lead the drow to choose to abandon the teachings of Lolth and cleave to Eilistraee.

The Silverhair knights have a wide array of tools dedicated to such purpose. They are specialized in wielding their swords to incapacitate opponents rather than outright killing them, and have spells capable of incapacitating targets by various means (for example, by letting them feel the weight of the suffering they have inflicted upon other creatures on themselves, or by projecting bolts of moonlight capable of weakening and temporarily draining the strength and energy of their targets). Their voice is also blessed by Eilistraee, it has the power to soothe suspicion, pain, fear and other negative emotions, and to enhance enchantment spells.  Only when the death of a drow can directly result in saving the life of others is lethal force permitted, and even then, a silverhair knight has to atone for her act.

Although most silverhair knights are female drow or half-drow, any worshipper of Eilistraee – regardless of race or gender – is welcomed to the order. When the silverhair knights find an encampment of drow, they are expected to observe the group from hiding for some time, learning their ways and personalities from afar, so that they can identify members of the group who might turn from Lolth's ways. Eventually, they are expected to infiltrate the group, identify and approach possible converts, and organize their escape to a safe location.
Silverhair knights dwell in out-of-the-way areas and generally avoid cities or other large metropolitan areas unless they are guiding a drow to a sanctuary within.

Rituals

Priestesses of Eilistraee pray for their spell at the rising of the Moon.

The faith and worship of Eilistraee is not bound by hard rules, it is free form expression through dance and song and all that is needed to celebrate her was a moonlit glade (or some kind of light, if in places that can't be reached by moonlight). Faithfuls disrobe and start dancing, seeking their goddess' blessing. However, there are rituals, as described below:

 The Circle of Song
Beside free form dancing and singing, the main form of ritual worship of Eilistraee is a hunt for food followed by a feast and a Circle of Song, in which the worshipers sit and dance by turns in a circle, each one in succession leading a song. If possible, the ritual has to be celebrated in a wooden area and on moon-lit nights.

 The Evensong and Flamesong
The Evensong is an intimate ritual that all followers of Eilistraee perform at the end of their day. It is a wordless message to their goddess (usually involving a personal dance and song) in which they let out all the emotions, experiences and reflections that they have gathered in the day, so that Eilistraee can listen to them. In the Promenade of Eilistraee this ritual took the particular form of the Flamesong, the most important personal prayer for the Dark Ladies and Maids (priestesses and novices, respectively), in which they danced around a flame or a candle. They would sing freely for their goddess and dance following the rhythm of the music as it came, until the flame was extinguished. Priestesses usually tried to find an alcove or passage where they could be alone to make a Flame Song. While they did, the Promenade was filled with the eerily beautiful echoes of half a dozen or more of these solos at once, drifting down the passages.

 The Hunt and High Hunt
The Hunt consists of tracking down and slaying/driving away a monster which represents a threat to the people living in the area. It is held whenever Eilistraee warns her followers of the presence of a peril/dangerous creature in the area (through the sound of her horn), in order to prevent it from hurting travelers or the inhabitants of nearby settlements. Hearing the Dark Maiden's hunting horn can also simply mean that someone nearby is in need of help.

Te High Hunt is a night time ritual led by clerics of Eilistraee, in which the faithful hunt a monster or animal as an offering to the goddess. The tradition allows the use of any kind of bladed weapon and armor, but the priestesses are required to wear as little as possible. It is usually held once per season and ends with a circle dance for the goddess if the quarry is slain (coupled with a feast if the quarry is edible).

 The Last Dance
Those among the clerics of Eilistraee who do not die in battle are blessed by Eilistraee with the ritual of the Last Dance. In old age, Eilistraee's priests hear the goddess singing to them by night, calling them to her. When the song feels right, they simply start to dance under the moonlit sky, unclad, never to be seen again. Those who observed such dances said that the goddess came and sang to her follower, and that as the aged priest danced, she would gradually gain the strength and energy of youth, looking younger and younger. Her hair began to glow with the same radiance as the Dark Maiden's, and then she would slowly fade away as the dance goes on. In the end, only a silvery radiance was seen and two voices – the goddess and her priest – were heard, raised together in a melancholy, tender song.

 The Run
The Run is a ritual that followers of Eilistraee undertake at least once per year. All those who take part in the ritual use particular boiled leaves and berries to make their hair silvery (which usually leads to sarcastic remarks from some drow of other faiths, who enjoy saying that such a color is to indicate their foolishness, although drow who do not worship Eilistraee can also have silver hair) and those who are not drow use natural colors to paint their bodies black. After this preparation, they go on a travel, wandering on the surface world, trusting to their music, kind ways, and sword skills to keep them from being slain as drow. The goal of the travel is for the followers of the Dark Maiden to go where they are strangers, reaching to elven and other races' communities to bring them food, joy (through music and dance), kindness and help of various kinds, not to preach their faith, but simply out of good heart and to show (together with their day-to-day activities) that drow can be rightful non-evil inhabitants of Faerun. Of course, the faithful are encouraged to use this time to also learn (and/or pass on) new songs, music, recipes and sword techniques.

 The Sword Dance
The Sword Dance is a ritual held when a new sword is forged or acquired by a worshipper of Eilistraee, in order to ask her blessing on the blade. It is performed by planting the weapon in the ground (the point turned down) and dancing, drawing a drop of blood from each of the priestess' limbs, moving momentarily against the blade. If the ritual is successful, the sword will gleam with silvery light, and for three months it won't rust and will be able to hit creatures that can only be wounded by magic.

Magic

 The Spellsong
The Spellsong is the ability to invoke a wide variety of magical effects through song and music, including replicating other spells, protecting from magic or healing. If more priestesses take part to a Spellsong, its power grows and become able to regenerate lost limbs or cure a wide variety of illnesses, poisons or other negative effects. This kind of magic is particularly common among the Sword Dancers of Eilistraee.

A particular form of Spellsong is the Grand Chorus, celebrated by the priestesses of the temple of the Promenade of Eilistraee. This is the greatest ritual of worship to Eilistraee, ''an ever-changing song of celebration led by a senior priestess who guides the song with an overriding theme or melody''. The Chorus could bring into being beams of moonlight, which intensity grows with the emotion of the singers. If such radiance meets with real moonlight, Eilistraee's power will make it so that all beings and items that the priestesses are touching or carrying while singing can, at will, be transported along a web of moonlight for as far as it reaches. In that way they can move from the location of the Chorus to any place on the surface lit by the moon and it is through this spell that the priestesses would travel to the surface for their missions.

 Eilistraee's Moonfire
The most iconic Eilistraeen spell is the Dark Maiden's Moonfire. It is a beacon of light, whose intensity and color can be controlled by the creator at will (ranging from a faint glow to a clear, bright – but not blinding – light). The radiance is bound to the creator, and can be moved and shaped around their body at will, and as fast as desired. Moonfire has the same intensity as moonlight, and it is generally used as a light source for reading, to see in the dark, as a signal for communication or for artistic purposes. More experienced clerics can move the moonfire away from their bodies, like the spell dancing lights. The caster can guide it in any direction, through any opening, and cause the glow to appear in any size, up to a volume determined by their power.
Eilistraee can also occasionally choose to gift any creature the power to temporarily manifest her moonfire.

Equipment

 Ceremonial Garb
Priestesses of Eilistraee generally wear their hair long (as a tribute to the goddess), but they have no specific ceremonial garb; instead, they are supposed to wear as little as possible during their official ceremonies.

 Dresses and Armor
When relaxing, the priestesses prefer silver, diaphanous gowns, but for their work or when they have to fight they still use the most appropriate garb for the situation (like armor, preferably magical and of drow make, in battle, haprons for cooking and leather garb for hunting).

 Holy symbols
The holy symbols of the faith vary, and include a silver sword pendant the size of a hand, a silver bastard sword outlined against a silver moon with silvery filaments, and a nude long-haired female drow dancing with a silver sword in front of a full moon. These are often worn as a pin or hung around the neck by means of a slender silver or mithril chain.

 Weapons
In battle, the priestesses have to wield swords when possible, and bladed weapons are preferred to other instruments when swords are not available. Longbows and silver-tipped arrows are usually used as secondary weapons.

 Relics
The most known Eilistraeen relics are the Singing Swords: twenty magical singing silver bastard swords provided by Eilistraee, once wielded by Qilue Veladorn and the Chosen of Eilistraee who patrolled the Pit of Ghaunadaur near Skullport. The swords sing constantly (and loudly) when unsheathed, and lose their abilities and bonuses when silenced. The blade's song makes its wielder confident and immune to charm, command, confusion, fear, friends, repulsion, scare and suggestion. An emotion cast on the wielder only causes rage, focused on the one who cast the emotion spell. The sword's song also cancels the effects of a harpy's song, silences shriekers, and can entrance weak, earthly, living creatures, although this ability can be negated by a bard's counter-song.

Temples
Temples of the Dark Maiden are typically established in the mouths of caverns or in woodlands, places that allow her followers to reach and act on the surface world. Temples in the Underdark – even shrines close to the surface – are unusual and the Promenade of the Dark Maiden is unique in being a large center of worship of the Dark Dancer, the main one, founded in the caverns of the Undermountain, to prevent the return of Ghaunadaur. Eilistraee's places of worship are chosen mostly like elves choose spots to dedicate to the Seldarine: followers of Eilistraee use natural places that need little modification and tend to live in harmony with their surroundings, leaving few traces of their passage, with only few exceptions (like the drow of the Promeande of the Dark Maiden). Temples typically include a glade in which to dance and from which the moon is fully visible, a dark place removed from the light of day, a thick tree canopy, a fresh water stream, a forge for the crafting of swords, an access tunnel to the Underdark, and a vein of iron or some other metal suitable for the craft. However, all of that is not necessary, as a shrine of the Dark Maiden only requires a moonlit glade and a song capable of leading one into a dance.

Notable followers
Two of the most popular Eilistraee followers in the Forgotten Realms novels are Liriel Baenre and Qilué of The Seven Sisters. Halisstra Melarn, the Lady Pentinent, was also a priestess of the Dark Maiden during the Silence of Lolth. Solaufein, a major NPC in Baldur's Gate II: Shadows of Amn, is also a follower of Eilistraee.

Background 
Eilistraee was first created for the original home campaign run by Ed Greenwood himself, appearing by manifestation, dream vision, and in person. At the behest of editor Newton Ewell, who wanted a deity for good drow in the game, Greenwood used the opportunity to make the Dark Dancer official and added Eilistraee to The Drow of the Underdark (1991) and thus to the official Forgotten Realms.

Greenwood designed Eilistraee as a nurturing mother goddess and a fertility goddess. The popular dancing-naked-under-moonlight aspect of the goddess and her faith was inspired by British traditions of fairies, and was intended to show her as non-warlike and non-violent, rather than capricious. She could be a protectress of her people and a terrific sword dancer, but she was intended to be a bard, not a huntress herself, only encouraging these skills in her followers, in order to help them survive on the surface. Neither was she a moon goddess, only one found under the moon as drow stole onto the surface at night. However, by association, the official Eilistraee acquired such skills and powers herself under later writers and development. Ed Greenwood denies a connection to Artemis/Diana of Greek and Roman mythology, though the later development appears to have made the official Eilistraee a little more similar.

Reception 
Rob Bricken of Kotaku identified Eilistraee as one of "The 13 Strangest Deities in Dungeons & Dragons", commenting: "To know Eilistraee, you have to know the Drow. The Drow are a race of evil elves who live underground and basically spend all their days murdering each other because they're so damn evil. There has been one good Drow in the history of D&D, and that's Drizzt Do'Urden, who is one of the Mary Sue-iest characters in all of fiction—and he's been the star of countless novels and is the only reason any D&D player has even been interested in the Drow, of which now there is a terrifying amount of material. Anyways, Eilistraee is apparently the goddess of good Drow, which means she has one worshipper on the planet. This is nonsense."

Trivia 
 In the computer game Neverwinter Nights: Hordes of the Underdark, Eilistraee's followers stand at the forefront of the ragtag rebel army's fight against the evil Valsharess. A mysterious priestess of Eilistraee known as the Seer leads a small band of Eilistraeen drow in an abandoned Lolthian temple, located in the Underdark port city of Lith My'athar.
 In the computer game Neverwinter Nights 2 and its expansions, Eilistraee is one of the deities that can be chosen by the player during character creation
 In the computer game Baldur's Gate 2: Shadows of Amn, Eilistraee is mentioned through one of her followers in the drow city of Ust Natha, Solaufein.
 In the board game Lords of Waterdeep, one of the quest cards available to the players is called "Protect converts to Eilistraee". The following quote can be found on the card: The Dark Lady smiles on those who see the deeper beauty within.

Notes

References 

Forgotten Realms deities